Naomi Ekperigin is an American comedian, actress and writer. She has written for the television shows Great News and Broad City.

Early life
Ekperigin was born and raised in Harlem, with a father from Nigeria and a mother from Detroit. She attended the Dalton School, where she was one of six black students in a class of 118, and graduated from Wesleyan University in 2005. In college, Ekperigin began performing comedy and doing improv.

Career
After graduating from college, Ekperigin spent a year touring with the National Theatre for the Deaf, and she returned to New York in 2007 where she got a start doing stand-up while working a day job at an art magazine. When that magazine folded in 2013, Ekperigin found a position working as a writer's assistant for Broad City. She was promoted to staff writer in the show's second season and served as a writer on season 3 as well.

In 2015, Ekperigin was a nominee, with the Broad City writing staff, for the Writers Guild of America Award for Television: Comedy Series. Splitsider praised her work as "savvy, smart, funny and politically active" and  Essence named her to its list of "8 Black Comediennes Who are 'Ready' for SNL."

In May 2016, Comedy Central announced that Ekperigin would create a half-hour special for the network, taped in New Orleans in June 2016. September 29, 2016, she made her late-night debut on Late Night with Seth Meyers. Her half-hour special premiered on Comedy Central just two weeks later, October 14 at midnight. Ekperigin also co-wrote a television pilot for Comedy Central with former Daily Show correspondent Jessica Williams. Ekperigin has also written for Difficult People and written for and appeared on Totally Biased with W. Kamau Bell.

She's been a regular performer on the WNYC podcast 2 Dope Queens, standing out as a fan favorite. Other projects include a pilot for TruTV called Inside Caucasia, developed with Ekperigin's fiancé, comedian Andy Beckerman.

In June 2017, she joined the writing staff of the NBC sitcom Great News, starring Briga Heelan, Andrea Martin, and John Michael Higgins. She then went on to write for season 2 of the CBS All Access show No Activity and the HBO limited series Mrs. Fletcher, starring Kathryn Hahn.

She has a recurring role in the Apple TV+ show Mythic Quest as Carol, the beleaguered HR person at a video game company. She was promoted to main role in season 3.

References

External links
 Sundance.tv, The Approval Matrix: 4 Questions with Comedian Naomi Ekperigin

Living people
21st-century American comedians
American television writers
Dalton School alumni
Wesleyan University alumni
Screenwriters from New York (state)
Year of birth missing (living people)
21st-century American screenwriters
African-American actresses
American people of Nigerian descent
Entertainers from New York City
21st-century African-American women writers
21st-century American women writers
21st-century African-American writers
People from Harlem